Kyung Hee Cyber University (abbreviated to KHCU) is a virtual, South Korean higher education institution that offers online bachelor's and master's degree programs. Founded in 2001, it has been recognized as the best cyber university in South Korea by both the Ministry of Education and the Korea Management Association.

Kyung Hee Cyber University is part of the Kyung Hee University System which offers comprehensive education from kindergarten through graduate school. The cyber university along with the programs it offers were constructed based on the tradition and knowledge of Kyung Hee University (KHC), a private higher education institution with over 70 years of history and expertise.

History
Kyung Hee Cyber University was established on March 3, 2001 as the first online initiative by the Kyung Hee University System.

In 2018, Kyung Hee Cyber University was awarded the grand prize in online education at the 2018 Korea Customer Satisfaction & Power Brand Awards.

Academics

Departments
 The School of Integrated Software and Design
 Future Human Science School
 Healthcare & Oriental Medicine
 Humanitas
 Social Welfare
 Art Sports
 International Languages/Cultures
 Culture and Communication
 Business Management
 Finance and Real Estate
 Hospitality/Tourism/Food Service
 Liberal Arts

Source:

Overseas culture tour
Kyung Hee Cyber University currently has 38 partner universities or institutions throughout Asia, 14 in North America, five in South America, five in Oceania, six in Europe, and four international alliances.

Notable alumni
As the Korean entertainment industry often provides both inconsistent and long schedules, South Korean singers, actors, and actresses have enrolled into cyber university as an alternative that does not limit them to a specific time or space.

The singers, actors, and actresses that have graduated from Kyung Hee Cyber University or are still enrolled include:

References

 
2001 establishments in South Korea
Educational institutions established in 2001
Universities and colleges in Seoul
Cyber
Distance education institutions based in South Korea